Glen(n) Thomas may refer to:

Glenn Thomas (American football), offensive coordinator for the UNLV Rebels
Glen Thomas (born 1967), footballer
Doe B (Glenn Thomas, 1991–2013), American rapper
'Truth Thomas', Glenn Thomas, singer-songwriter and poet

See also

Thomas Glenn (disambiguation)

de:Glenn Thomas